Carlo Silipo (born September 10, 1971 in Naples) is a retired water polo player from Italy, who represented his native country at three Summer Olympics: 1992, 1996 and 2004. After having won the gold medal in Barcelona, Spain, he won bronze with the men's national team at the 1996 Summer Olympics in Atlanta, United States.

See also
 Italy men's Olympic water polo team records and statistics
 List of Olympic champions in men's water polo
 List of Olympic medalists in water polo (men)
 List of players who have appeared in multiple men's Olympic water polo tournaments
 List of world champions in men's water polo
 List of World Aquatics Championships medalists in water polo
 List of members of the International Swimming Hall of Fame

References

RAI profile

External links
 
 

1971 births
Living people
Italian male water polo players
Water polo players at the 1992 Summer Olympics
Water polo players at the 1996 Summer Olympics
Water polo players at the 2000 Summer Olympics
Water polo players at the 2004 Summer Olympics
Olympic water polo players of Italy
Olympic gold medalists for Italy
Olympic bronze medalists for Italy
Water polo players from Naples
Olympic medalists in water polo
World Aquatics Championships medalists in water polo
Medalists at the 1996 Summer Olympics
Medalists at the 1992 Summer Olympics